Hillington railway station was a station in Hillington, Norfolk on the now closed Midland and Great Northern Joint Railway line between South Lynn and Melton Constable. It closed in 1959 along with the rest of the line.

References

Disused railway stations in Norfolk
Former Midland and Great Northern Joint Railway stations
Railway stations in Great Britain opened in 1879
Railway stations in Great Britain closed in 1959
Hillington, Norfolk